The Harvest is the first full-length album by hardcore/metalcore band Alove for Enemies. It was released in 2005 on Facedown Records.

Track listing
"Prologue" - 1:20
"Angels Don't Burn" - 3:06
"Smoke Screen" - 3:53
"The Hour of Decision" - 2:59
"The Harvest" - 3:39
"Thieves in the Crowd" - 2:33
"My Days Are Vanity" - 2:57
"Blood Covenant" - 2:25
"Cravings of the Heart" - 2:47
"Son of the Morning" - 2:45
"The Truth of Trumpets" - 2:59

2005 debut albums
Alove for Enemies albums
Facedown Records albums